Amzie Beal (Chappie) Snodgrass (May 18, 1870 – September 9, 1951) was a Major League Baseball outfielder. Snodgrass played for the Baltimore Orioles in the  season. On May 15, he batted third in the lineup and produced his first and only hit. Over the course of three games, he had one hit in ten at-bats. He batted and threw right-handed.

He was born in Springfield, Ohio and died in New York City.

External links

1870 births
1951 deaths
Baseball players from Ohio
Baltimore Orioles (1901–02) players
Baton Rouge Red Sticks players